The 1997–98 C.D. Motagua season in the Honduran football league was divided into two halves, Apertura and Clausura.  Motagua was capable to win both tournaments, having achieved the first bi-championship in their history.

Apertura

Squad

Source:

Standings

Matches

Results by round

Regular season

Hexagonal

 Motagua 1–1 Real España on aggregate; Motagua advanced on better Regular season record.

Semifinals

 Motagua 2–2 Olimpia on aggregate; Motagua advanced on better Regular season record.

Final

 Motagua won 5–1 on aggregate.

Clausura

Squad

Standings

Matches

Results by round

Regular season

Hexagonal

 Motagua won 5–2 on aggregate.

Semifinals

 Motagua won 5–4 on aggregate.

Final

 Motagua won 1–0 on aggregate.

1998 Torneo Grandes de Centroamérica

Matches

Preliminary round

 Comunicaciones 0–0 Motagua on aggregate score; Motagua won 4–3 on penalty shootouts.

Group B

References

External links
Motagua Official Website

F.C. Motagua seasons
Motagua
Motagua